Shabankareh is a city in Bushehr Province, Iran.

Shabankareh may also refer to:
Shabankareh, Kermanshah
Shabankareh, Razavi Khorasan
Shabankareh District, in Bushehr Province
Shabankara, an ancient tribal federation